Regina Pasqua is a provincial electoral district for the Legislative Assembly of Saskatchewan, Canada. It was first contested in the 2016 election.

The riding was created from former Regina South, Regina Lakeview, Regina Rosemont and Regina Qu'Appelle Valley districts.

Members of the Legislative Assembly

Election results

References

Saskatchewan provincial electoral districts
Politics of Regina, Saskatchewan